Landri may refer to:

 Landri Sales, municipality in Brazil
 Derek Landri (born 1983), American football player